On Our Selection is a 1912 Australian play by Bert Bailey and Edmund Duggan based on the stories with the same name by Steele Rudd. Bailey played Dad Rudd in the original production.

Plot
The play consists of four acts. It starts with the selection of Dad Rudd in the grip of drought. His neighbour John Carey seizes his stock for a debt, partly to get revenge for Dad having secured an adjoining piece of land coveted by Carey. Carey's playboy son Jim is romantically interested in Dad's daughter Kate and follows her to Brisbane.

Kate returns home to escape Jim Carey, who follows her home. There is an encounter between Jim Carey, Kate and Kate's boyfriend Sandy which results in Sandy knocking Carey unconscious.  Jim Carey is discovered by local eccentric, 'Cranky Jack', who recognises Carey as the man who ran off with Jack's wife and strangles him to death. The body is discovered by Sandy and Kate who believe that Sandy has accidentally been responsible for killing Carey. Sandy escapes detection and the inquest returns a verdict that Jim Carey was murdered by some person or persons unknown.

Dad Rudd becomes a prosperous farmer and his friends encourage him to run for parliament against John Carey. Carey overhears an incriminating conversation between Sandy and Kate and arranges a warrant for Sandy's arrest. However Crank Jack then attacks John Carey, thinking he is his son, confessing to the crime. He is dragged away and Sandy's name is cleared. Dad Rudd is elected to parliament.

History
Steele Rudd originally worked on an adaptation of his stories in collaboration with Beaumont Smith. The result was unsatisfactory, so Bailey and Duggan wrote their version. However Beaumont Smith was credited as co-author in some articles on the original production. The main change the adaptors made to the stories was to add more of a plot, building up the character of Carey into a villain, making "Cranky Jack" a murderer and throwing suspicion on Sandy.

Original cast
Bert Bailey as Dad (Joseph Murtagh) Rudd
Guy Hastings as Sandy
Fred MacDonald as Dave Rudd
Alfreda Bevan as Mum
 Willie Driscoll	as Uncle Rudd	
Edmund Duggan as Moloney	
Alfred Harford	as the Reverend Mr Macpherson		
George Kensington	as John Carey
Mary Marlowe	as Kate Rudd
Laura Roberts as Sara Rudd
George Treloar as Jim Carey
Queenie Sefton as Mrs White
Jack Lennon as Cranky Jack			
 Lilias Adeson		
Arthur Bertram

Reception
The play made its debut in Sydney at the Theatre Royal on 4 May 1912 and was an enormous success. It toured throughout the country and was frequently revived until the 1930s.

Film adaptations
The 1932 version of On Our Selection, which starred Bailey and MacDonald, and its three sequels, owed more to the play than Steele Rudd's original stories. The 1920 version from director Raymond Longford was closer to the stories.

Later revivals
The play was revived again in 1979 by director George Whaley at the Jane Street Theatre with Don Crosby as Dad, Geoffrey Rush as Dave and Mel Gibson as Sandy, plus Noni Hazlehurst, Jon Blake, John Clayton and Kerry Walker. This production was later transferred to the Nimrod Theatre and was adapted into a film by Whaley in 1995.

References

External links
Complete play at National Archives of Australia
On Our Selection cast in original production at AusStage
1979 Jane St production with Mel Gibson

Australian plays
1912 plays